Pence is a small unincorporated community in Jordan Township, Warren County, in the U.S. state of Indiana.

History
Pence was founded in September 1902 by Frank R. Pence, who purchased  of land for the purpose.  In 1903, Pence became the smallest town in the United States to have a central water system.  In the early part of the 20th century, Pence had numerous businesses including a grain elevator, a blacksmith shop, a welding and machine shop, a lumber yard, a coal yard, the Bank of Pence (which closed in the 1920s), a hotel (which also housed the post office for a time), restaurants, a general store, grocery stores, a hardware store, a weekly newspaper, a funeral home, a jewelry store, and various others.  As of 1913, the population was about 150.

Pence had a baseball team from 1910 to 1955, and also had a basketball team (the Pence Aces).

The post office operated from October 12, 1903 to April 5, 1957.

Mike Pence visited the town when running for governor in 2012.

Geography
Pence is located less than a mile east of the Indiana-Illinois state line and a quarter mile from Jordan Creek, which flows southwest toward the Vermilion River.  It is on County Road 300 North, which (in Illinois) runs into the town of Rossville about 9 miles to the west.

Demographics

References

Warren County Historical Society. A History of Warren County, Indiana (1966), pages 20–25.
Warren County Historical Society. A History of Warren County, Indiana (175th Anniversary Edition) (2002).

Unincorporated communities in Indiana
Unincorporated communities in Warren County, Indiana
Populated places established in 1902
1902 establishments in Indiana